The Poker Stakes is a Grade III American Thoroughbred horse race for horses aged four years old and older held over a distance of one mile (8 furlongs) on the turf held annually in mid June at Belmont Park in Elmont, New York.

History

The event is named in honor of Poker who defeated champions Assagai and his stablemate Buckpasser in the 1967 Bowling Green Handicap at Belmont Park. More importantly Poker became a Champion Broodmare Sire. Poker was a son of the top-class sire and broodmare sire Round Table. Poker's daughters produced numerous champions including champion sire Seattle Slew. The latter twice topped the US broodmare sires list, and his daughters have produced a host of champions. Poker is also the maternal grandsire of US champion, Silver Charm, as well as the useful sire, Lomond (himself a champion sire in Italy).

The inaugural running of the Poker Stakes was on 25 September 1983 and was won by the Gasper S. Moshera trained Freon in a time of 2:03 over the distance of a mile and a quarter on the turf. The following year the event was not held but in 1985 it was run over the  miles distance.

The event was classified as Grade III in 1988 and has held this class since.

The event was not held in 2010.

Several fine horses have appeared in this event including Volponi who won the event in 2007 and later won the Breeders' Cup Classic in the same year. Also Kip Deville winner of the Breeders' Cup Mile in 2007 featured in this event 2008 winning easily as the short odds on favorite and giving up to eleven pounds to his competitors. Caress and the Australian bred mare Oleksandra are the only mares to have won this race. Oleksandra was having her last start in her career due to being in foal to the sire Into Mischief.

Records
Speed record:
 1:31.23 – Oscar Performance (2018)
This time is a course record for Belmont's Widener Turf Course, and ties the North American record for one mile on the turf.

Margins:
 7 lengths – Scottish Monk (1990)

Most wins:
 2 – Fourstardave (1989, 1993)
 2 – Affirmed Success (2000, 2001)
 2 – King Kreesa (2013, 2015)

Most wins by an owner:
 3 – Juddmonte Farms (2003, 2007, 2022)

Most wins by a jockey:
 3 – José L. Ortiz (2015, 2018, 2020)
 3 – Jose Lezcano (2011, 2012, 2016)
 3 – Jerry Bailey (1991, 1998, 2001)
 3 – Jorge Chavez (1994, 1999, 2000)
 3 – José A. Santos (1987, 1988, 1989)

Most wins by a trainer:
 2 – Todd A. Pletcher (2015, 2018, 2020)
 2 – Angel Penna Jr. (1997, 2005)
 2 – Richard Schosberg (2000, 2001)
 2 – Robert J. Frankel (2003, 2007)
 2 – Richard E. Dutrow Jr. (2006, 2008)

Winners

Legend:

 

Notes:

§ Ran as part of an entry

ƒ Filly or Mare

See also
 List of American and Canadian Graded races

References

Graded stakes races in the United States
Turf races in the United States
Open mile category horse races
Recurring sporting events established in 1983
Belmont Park
1983 establishments in New York (state)
Grade 3 stakes races in the United States